Hendrik "Erik" Dekker (born 21 August 1970) is a retired Dutch professional road racing cyclist active from 1992 until 2006. He was a member of the Rabobank cycling team from 1992 till 2006. From 2007 to 2015 he was one of Rabobank's team managers.

Cycling career

Amateur career
Dekker rode his first race at eight, and soon became successful. In 1985 he was invited to join the national selection for juniors. As an amateur, his most important results were second places at the youth world championships in Bergamo in 1987 and at the road race in the 1992 Summer Olympics.
In that Olympic road race, Dekker got away at 30 km before the finish, together with Fabio Casartelli and Dainis Ozols.  Dekker was outsprinted by Casartelli, but was so happy that he won a medal that he also finished with his arms in the air.

Directly after the Olympic Games, he became professional, and rode his first race a few weeks later in the Tour de l'Avenir.

Professional career
His first win as a professional was a stage of the Tour of the Basque Country of 1994, the year he rode his first Tour de France. In 1997 Dekker won the Ronde van Nederland, but a large part of 1998 was lost because of injuries.

The year 2000 was Dekker's best. He won three stages in the 2000 Tour de France, although neither a sprinter nor a favourite for the overall win, and was voted most combative cyclist. In the autumn of that year, Dekker won his first classic, the Clásica de San Sebastián.

In 2001 Dekker won the Amstel Gold Race and the UCI Road World Cup. In the 2001 Tour de France he took a stage, after having helped his teammate Marc Wauters to a stage win. At the end of the year he was named Dutch Sportsman of the year.

The years 2002 and 2003 were less successful because of injuries. He came back in 2004 in the spring classics and a victory in Paris–Tours. He had announced his retirement for the autumn of 2006, but he crashed heavily in the 2006 Tour de France and decided to stop.

Managing career
In 2007, Dekker started as team manager of the Rabobank team. At the end of the 2015 season, he left the team.

Major results

1991
2nd Overall Olympia's Tour
1st Stage 5b (ITT)
3rd Ronde van Overijssel
7th Overall Tour of Sweden
1992
Tour de l'Avenir
1st Stages 8 & 10
2nd  Road race, Olympic Games
3rd Overall GP Tell
1st Prologue
8th Milano–Torino
10th GP des Amériques
1994
1st  Overall Tour of Sweden
1st Prologue & Stage 6b (ITT)
1st Stage 1 Tour of the Basque Country
7th Overall Tour de Luxembourg
1995
1st  Overall Tour of Sweden
1st Prologue & Stage 3a (ITT)
1st Grote Prijs Jef Scherens
1st Rund um Köln
6th Overall Tour de Luxembourg
1996
National Road Championships
1st  Time trial
3rd Road race
1st Seraing-Aachen-Seraing
5th Overall Ronde van Nederland
6th Overall Regio-Tour
1st Prologue
10th Grand Prix des Nations
1997
1st  Overall Ronde van Nederland
1st Stage 3b (ITT)
2nd Time trial, National Road Championships
7th Overall Route du Sud
10th GP Rik Van Steenbergen
1998
2nd Overall Tour de Luxembourg
10th Time trial, UCI Road World Championships
1999
1st Grand Prix Eddy Merckx (with Marc Wauters)
2nd Overall Rheinland-Pfalz Rundfahrt
1st Stages 2b (ITT) & 6
2nd Overall Ronde van Nederland
2nd Time trial, National Road Championships
2nd Trofeo Calvià
3rd Veenendaal–Veenendaal
7th Overall KBC Driedaagse van De Panne-Koksijde
7th Clásica de San Sebastián
7th HEW Cyclassics
8th Time trial, UCI Road World Championships
9th Overall Vuelta a Andalucía
10th Coppa Sabatini
2000
1st  Overall Ronde van Nederland
1st Prologue
Tour de France
1st Stages 8, 11 & 17
 Combativity award Overall
1st Clásica de San Sebastián
1st Josef Voegeli Memorial
National Road Championships
1st  Time trial
3rd Road race
2nd Overall Tour of Sweden
1st Prologue & Stage 3
3rd Grand Prix Eddy Merckx (with Marc Wauters)
4th Le Samyn
7th Clásica de Almería
2001
1st  UCI Road World Cup
1st Amstel Gold Race
1st Grand Prix Eddy Merckx (with Marc Wauters)
1st  Overall Guldensporentweedaagse
1st Stage 1
1st  Overall Rheinland-Pfalz Rundfahrt
1st Stage 2
1st  Overall Vuelta a Andalucía
1st Stage 8 Tour de France
2nd Tour of Flanders
2nd Overall Ronde van Nederland
1st Stage 6 
2nd Overall KBC Driedaagse van De Panne-Koksijde
3rd HEW Cyclassics
4th Road race, UCI Road World Championships
5th Züri-Metzgete
5th Rund um Köln
8th Liège–Bastogne–Liège
9th Clásica de San Sebastián
2002
 1st  Overall Tirreno–Adriatico
1st Stage 4 (ITT)
1st  Overall Guldensporentweedaagse
1st Stage 3
1st  Time trial, National Road Championships
1st Trofeo Calvià
2nd Overall Ronde van Nederland
3rd Grand Prix Eddy Merckx (with Marc Wauters)
6th Overall Vuelta a Andalucía
1st Stage 5
6th Overall Volta a la Comunitat Valenciana
2003
1st Overall Grote Prijs Erik Breukink
2nd Tour Beneden-Maas
2004
1st  Overall Ronde van Nederland
1st Stage 6
1st  Road race, National Road Championships
1st Paris–Tours
1st Ronde van Drenthe
1st Noord-Nederland Tour
5th Tour of Flanders
5th Liège–Bastogne–Liège
7th Amstel Gold Race
8th Overall Vuelta a Andalucía
2005
2nd Overall Eneco Tour
2nd Time trial, National Road Championships
7th E3 Prijs Vlaanderen
2006
1st Stage 2 Ster Elektrotoer (ITT)
1st Egmond-pier-Egmond
2nd Overall Critérium International
1st Stage 1
National Road Championships
2nd Time trial
6th Road race
7th Overall Paris–Nice

See also
 List of Dutch Olympic cyclists

References

External links
 
 Erik Dekker Classic, a cycling race for amateurs that supports Foundation KiKa, named after and organised by Erik Dekker

1970 births
Living people
Cyclists at the 1992 Summer Olympics
Cyclists at the 1996 Summer Olympics
Cyclists at the 2000 Summer Olympics
Cyclists at the 2004 Summer Olympics
Dutch male cyclists
Dutch Tour de France stage winners
Olympic cyclists of the Netherlands
Olympic medalists in cycling
Olympic silver medalists for the Netherlands
People from Hoogeveen
Dutch cycling time trial champions
UCI Road World Championships cyclists for the Netherlands
Cyclists from Drenthe
Medalists at the 1992 Summer Olympics
UCI Road World Cup winners
20th-century Dutch people
21st-century Dutch people